The 2008–09 WRU Challenge Cup, known for sponsorship reasons as the SWALEC Cup, was the 39th WRU Challenge Cup, the annual national rugby union cup competition of Wales. The competition was won by Neath RFC, who had previously won it five times, in 1971–72, 1988–89, 1989–90, 2003–04 and 2007–08.

Calendar

Matches

Round 1

Round 2

Round 3

Round 4

Round 5

Round 6

Finals

Quarter-finals

Semi-finals

Final

External links
WRU Challenge Cup on BBC.co.uk

WRU Challenge Cup
Challenge Cup